Jonathan Summers (born 2 October 1946) is an Australian  operatic baritone who has mainly worked in the UK. He sang the role of Captain Balstrode in the 1980 recording of Benjamin Britten's Peter Grimes which won a Grammy award for Best Opera recording.

Early life 

Summers was born in Melbourne and in that city studied art at Prahran Technical College (1964–9) and singing with Bettine McCaughan (1964–74). From 1970 to 1974, he worked as a technical operator and recording engineer with the Radio Division of the Australian Broadcasting Commission.  In 1973 he won the ABC Instrumental and Vocal Competition.  In 1974, he moved to London, where he studied with Otakar Kraus until 1980.

Career 

Summers's professional debut in opera took place in 1975, when he sang the title role in Rigoletto with Kent Opera.  He was a member of The Royal Opera, Covent Garden, from 1976 to 1986, singing such roles as Albert in Werther, the Animal Tamer in the British premiere of the three-act version of Lulu, Demetrius in A Midsummer Night's Dream, Papageno in The Magic Flute, Ford in Falstaff, Sharpless in Madama Butterfly and Marcello in La bohème.  He has also appeared with English National Opera, Scottish Opera, Opera North and Welsh National Opera.

References

1946 births
Living people
Australian operatic baritones
Helpmann Award winners